Pichaqani (Aymara pichaqa, phichaqa, piqacha a big needle, -ni a suffix, "the one with a big needle", also spelled Pichacani) is a  mountain in the Bolivian Andes. It is located in the Cochabamba Department, Quillacollo Province, Vinto Municipality. Pichaqani lies southwest of Tunari and southeast of Phullu Punchu.

References 

Mountains of Cochabamba Department